The Tablet may refer to:
 The Tablet, an international Catholic weekly newspaper, published in London since 1840
 The Tablet (Brooklyn), a weekly Catholic newspaper published since 1908 by the Diocese of Brooklyn, New York
 The New Zealand Tablet, a former weekly Catholic newspaper published in New Zealand
 Tablet (magazine), an American Jewish online magazine

See also 
 Tablet (religious)
 Tablet (disambiguation)